A Hermione-class frigate was a type of 30-gun frigate of the French Navy, carrying a half-battery of 12-pounder long guns on the lower deck as its main armament, and a complete battery of 6-pounder guns on the upper deck. Two ships of this type were built in 1699 on plans by Blaise Pangalo. They were labelled "5th-rank frigates-ships" at the time.

Ships 
 Hermione
Builder: Brest 
Begun: May 1699 
Launched: 23 September 1699 
Completed: early 1700
Fate: "Lost" about April 1705

 Méduse
Builder: Brest 
Begun: May 1699 
Launched: 24 September 1699 
Completed: early 1700
Fate: Wrecked, either in 1733 at Port-Louis according to Vichot, or in the Indies in 1713.

Notes and references

Notes

References

Bibliography 
 

 
1690s ships
Frigate classes